Take My Own Advice was the sixth album released by Canadian singer-songwriter Willie P. Bennett and was released on compact disc by Dark Light Records in 1993 (DL 12003), the same label that had previously issued his compilation album Collectibles.

The title track is a re-recording of a song from Bennett's 1979 album Blackie and the Rodeo King.

Track listing
 "L.A.D.T. (Livin' in a Dirty Town)" (6:14)
 "Jukebox" (3:14)
 "(If I Could) Take My Own Advice" (3:06)
 "Step Away" (4:59)
 "You Care" (4:44)
 "Sometimes It Comes So Easy" (4:18)
 "Katie's Tune" (3:17)
 "Breaking the Silence" (3:44)
 "Blood Brother" (5:06)
 "Push On" (4:39)
 "Red Dress" (2:06)
 "Why'd I Go Zydeco" (instrumental) (2:06)

All words and music by Willie P. Bennett, all songs published by Eiffel Dog Publishing.

Personnel
 Willie P. Bennett – vocals, guitar
 Mike Holder - pedal steel
 Denis Pendrith - bass
 Ken Harrison - organ
 Ed White - drums
 Jeff Arsenault - drums ("Red Dress", "Zydeco", "Sometimes...", "Jukebox" and "Breaking the Silence")
 Colin Linden - acoustic, electric and slide guitar, dobro
 Colleen Peterson - harmony vocal
\technical
 Produced by Peter J. Moore
 Recorded by Simon Less with the MDI 24 track digital remote
 Mixed by Simon Less and Peter J. Moore (MDI studios, Toronto, Ontario)
 Mastered by Peter J. Moore with the sonic solutions at the "E" room, Toronto, Ontario

1993 albums
Willie P. Bennett albums